Edmund Piątkowski (31 January 1936 – 28 March 2016) was a Polish track and field athlete, who competed in the discus event.

Piątkowski was multiple time Polish champion in the discus (1955, 1957–66, 1968–69).  He participated in four European Championships in Athletics (1958, 1962, 1966, 1969), and three Olympic Games (1960, 1964, 1968).

In 1958, he won the gold medal at the 6th European Championships in Stockholm. In May 1959, he broke the European record (57.89); afterward in June 1959, he set the world record (59.91) at the Kusociński Memorial meet in Warsaw. Two years later, in August 1961, he yet again topped the European record (60.47) in Łódź.

In 1960, Piątkowski took 5th place in the 17th Olympic Games at Rome. In 1962, he took 4th at Belgrade (7th EU-ch). In 1964, he took 7th at Tokyo (18th Ol). In 1966, he took 4th at Budapest (8th EU-ch). In 1967, he won at Kiev (2nd European Cup). In 1968, he took 7th at Mexico City (19th Ol). In 1969, he took 12th at Athens (9th EU-ch). He died on 28 March 2016 at the age of 80.

References

External links 
 
 

1936 births
2016 deaths
Polish male discus throwers
Athletes (track and field) at the 1960 Summer Olympics
Athletes (track and field) at the 1964 Summer Olympics
Athletes (track and field) at the 1968 Summer Olympics
Olympic athletes of Poland
World record setters in athletics (track and field)
People from Pabianice County
European Athletics Championships medalists
Sportspeople from Łódź Voivodeship
Universiade medalists in athletics (track and field)
Legia Warsaw athletes
Universiade gold medalists for Poland
Medalists at the 1961 Summer Universiade
20th-century Polish people